Christopher Porterfield is an American songwriter, guitarist and singer.  He currently leads the folk band Field Report. Porterfield started his music career in High School, co-founding the band, Dinner With Greg. He also previously played with DeYarmond Edison, a band led by Bon Iver frontman Justin Vernon.  He graduated from Mayo High School in Rochester, MN, and the University of Wisconsin-Eau Claire with a degree in journalism. He has a younger brother named Tim, who graduated and played college basketball for Viterbo University in Wisconsin.

References

Living people
American male songwriters
American folk guitarists
University of Wisconsin–Eau Claire alumni
Year of birth missing (living people)
DeYarmond Edison members